Geoffrey Frank Power (7 April 1899 – 1963) was an English professional footballer who played as an inside forward for Sunderland.

References

1899 births
1963 deaths
Footballers from Sunderland
English footballers
Association football inside forwards
Sunderland A.F.C. players
Blackpool F.C. players
Darwen F.C. players
Fleetwood Town F.C. players
Denaby United F.C. players
Eston United F.C. players
Scarborough F.C. players
English Football League players
Date of death missing